A subaudible tone is a tone that is used to trigger an automated event at a radio station.  A subaudible tone is audible; however, it is usually at a low level that is not noticeable to the average listener at normal volumes.  It is a form of in-band signaling.

Overview

These tones are included in the audible main portion of audio in the case of satellite; on tape, these often are filtered.  Normally, subaudible tones are at one of the following frequencies: 25, 35, 50, 75 hertz (Hz), or combinations of those frequencies.  Until computerized radio automation became inexpensive and common, 25 and 35 Hz were used either in the audio stream or, in the case of tape cartridges used in radio broadcasting (better known as "carts"), on a special track on the tape to indicate to a radio station's automation system that it was time to trigger another event.

With the advent of computers and digital satellite, these tones are relegated to triggering commercial announcements and legal IDs on a dwindling number of radio networks, as tones in the audio have been supplanted by external data channels sent independent of audio on digital satellite feeds for radio.  These trigger relay closure terminals on the satellite receiver itself (Starguide being a prominent system).

Use for filmstrips

Subaudible tones have also been used by later filmstrip projectors to advance to the next frame in a filmstrip presentation.  Previously, the phonographic record or audio cassette accompanying a filmstrip to provide its soundtrack would have an audible tone to signal the person operating the projector to advance the film to the next frame.  But automatic filmstrip projectors were introduced in the 1970s (that had an integrated cassette player) that would read a subaudible tone of 50 Hz recorded on the cassette to automatically trigger the projector to advance to the next frame.

Most of the cassettes accompanying filmstrips from the 1970s and 80s would have one side of the cassette with audible tones for use with older manual projectors, and the other side with the same program audio, but with 50 Hz subaudible tones instead for automatic projectors.  Some filmstrip releases would have both audible & subaudible tones combined, making the filmstrip and its companion cassette compatible with any filmstrip projector.

External links
Examples of subaudible tone units

Radio technology
Broadcast engineering